Teterevino is a rural locality (a selo) in Prokhorovsky District, Belgorod Oblast, Russia. The population was 328 as of 2010. There are 7 streets.

Geography 
Teterevino is located 25 km southwest of Prokhorovka (the district's administrative centre) by road. Volobuyevka is the nearest rural locality.

References 

Rural localities in Prokhorovsky District